The Spanish Peaks Wilderness is a  wilderness area in Huerfano County and Las Animas County, Colorado, United States, located  southwest of Walsenburg. All of the wilderness area is located within San Isabel National Forest, which is managed by the U.S. Forest Service.

Geography
The Spanish Peaks are prominent landmarks along the eastern front of the southern Rockies. However, this difference is not readily discernible from a distance.

History
The Peaks have traditional and religious significance to American Indian tribes including the Apache, Comanche, and Ute. The common Indian name appears in at least three different spellings in various accounts, reflecting different renditions of oral expression. These are "Wahatoya", Huajatolla" or Guajatoyah". This is widely reported to be a Ute name meaning "breasts of the earth", but is in fact a Comanche name translating to "double mountain".

Geology
The Spanish Peaks are geologically distinct from the faulted and uplifted mountains of the Sangre de Cristo range to the west. To the geologist the Spanish Peaks are prime examples of "stocks" which are defined as large masses of igneous (molten) rock which intruded layers of sedimentary rock and were later exposed by erosion. When mapped by geologists the Peaks were found to be masses of granite, granodiorite, and syenodiorite.

Among the most unusual features of the Spanish Peaks are the great dikes which radiate out from the mountains like spokes of a wheel. These walls of rock are often spectacular.  They are easily visible from the highway north of the peaks (and west of Walsenburg), and pictures of them have been used as type examples in more than one introductory geology textbook.  Several can be easily seen up close on back dirt roads, and one (Apishapa Arch) on the south side of the peaks can actually be driven through.

References

Protected areas of Huerfano County, Colorado
Protected areas of Las Animas County, Colorado
Wilderness areas of Colorado
Protected areas established in 2000
San Isabel National Forest